The 2017-18 season  was the 46th edition of the National Basketball League of England. Loughborough University won their 1st league title.

NBL1

Teams
Team changes

Promoted from NBL2
 Kent Crusaders
 Newcastle University

Relegated to NBL2
 Essex Leopards
 Westminster Warriors
Folded
 London Lituanica

Regular season

Playoffs
Quarter-finals

Semi-finals

Final

NBL2

Teams
Team changes

Promoted to NBL1
 Kent Crusaders
 Newcastle University
Relegated from NBL1
 Essex Leopards
 Westminster Warriors

Promoted from NBL3
 Birmingham Elite
 Middlesex LTBC
 Sussex Bears
Relegated to NBL3
 East London All-Stars
Folded
 Doncaster Danum Eagles (relegated)
 Tees Valley Mohawks

Regular season

Playoffs
Quarter-finals

Semi-finals

Final

NBL3

Teams
Team changes

Promoted to NBL2
 Birmingham Elite
 Middlesex LTBC
 Sussex Bears
Relegated from NBL2
 East London All-Stars
Folded
 Coventry Tornadoes
 Brunel University

Promoted from NBL4
 Manchester Giants II
 Sunderland University
 Northants Taurus
 WLV Albion
 University of Essex
 Swindon Shock
 Cardiff City
Relegated to NBL4
 Sefton Stars
 Mansfield Giants
 Thames Valley Cavaliers II

Regular season

North Division

South Division

Playoffs
Quarter-finals

Semi-finals

Final

NBL4

Regular season

Playoffs
Quarter-finals

Semi-finals

Final

Cup Competitions

National Cup

National Trophy

Patrons Cup

National Shield

References

English Basketball League seasons
English
English
Basketball
Basketball